Johanna Buska (14 April 1847 or 1848 – 16 May 1922) was a German actress and opera singer.

Life 
Buska was born in Königsberg. After engagements at the Burgtheater and an affair with Rudolf, Crown Prince of Austria she married the Hungarian nobleman Miklós Kázmér (Nikolaus Casimir) Török de Szendrő on 20 May 1880. During the four-year marriage a child was born, who possibly was from Rudolf. After Török's death the actress married the Prague theatre director and singer Angelo Neumann. She returned to the stage again and played among others Ibsen's Nora in Prague in 1888; at the beginning of the twentieth century she appeared in 's comedy Im bunten Rock.

Buska's first marriage inspired Theodor Fontane to write his novel Count Petöfy. In the Klassik Stiftung Weimar and art collections a letter from Buska to Julius Rodenberg is kept; in the Österreichische Nationalbibliothek there are several autographs of the actress, especially from the collection of Otto Frankfurter. In the Alfred Reucker-Archive of the Akademie der Künste are also autographs and photos by Buska from the time of Angelo Neumann's death in December 1910.

Buska died in Dresden.

Further reading 
 Constantin von Wurzbach: Török von Szendrö in Biographisches Lexikon des Kaiserthums Oesterreich
 Ludwig Eisenberg: Grosses biographisches Lexikon der deutschen Bühne im XIX. Jahrhundert. List, Leipzig 1903, .
 Egon Erwin Kisch: Marktplatz der Sensationen. Aufbau-Taschenbuch-Verlag, Berlin 1997, .

References 

German stage actresses
Date of birth missing
1922 deaths
Actors from Königsberg
19th-century German actresses
19th-century German women opera singers
20th-century German actresses
Musicians from Königsberg